Eupithecia puella is a moth in the family Geometridae. It is found in south-western China (Yunnan).

The wingspan is about 19 mm. The forewings are grey, heavily irrorated with dark brown scales. The hindwings are whitish.

References

Moths described in 2004
puella
Moths of Asia